Mount Hutton is a  summit located in the John Muir Wilderness area of the Sierra National Forest. A nearby smaller peak of this mountain is called Blackcap Mountain. In 1973 this mountain was named for James Hutton whose work laid the foundation for the modern field of geology.

See also 

 List of mountain peaks of California

References 

Mountains of the John Muir Wilderness
Mountains of Fresno County, California
North American 3000 m summits